Mesosa nebulosa is a species of beetle in the family Cerambycidae. It was described by Johan Christian Fabricius in 1781, originally under the genus Lamia. It has a wide distribution throughout Europe and the Caucasus.

M. nebulosa feeds on Corylus avellana, Ficus carica, and Juglans regia.

Subspecies
 Mesosa nebulosa algerica Pic, 1898
 Mesosa nebulosa nebulosa (Fabricius, 1781)

References

nebulosa
Beetles described in 1781